Cityfight: Modern Combat in the Urban Environment is a board game published by Simulations Publications (SPI) in 1979.

Description
Cityfight: Modern Combat in the Urban Environment is a two-player wargame that depicts post-World War II combat in an urban environment. Published before the Fall of the Berlin Wall, the game posits that the Cold War has gone hot, and Russia has invaded West Germany. Combat takes place in villages and suburbs on the outskirts of an unnamed German city.

Components
The game box includes:
two identical 17" x 22" hex grid maps (one for each player) scaled at 55 ft (17 m) per hex
1400 counters
64-page rulebook
40-page book of charts and tables
8-page Charts & Tables booklet
4 six-sided dice
 counter tray

Gameplay
Cityfight uses a "double-blind" system of dual boards so that each player does not know where his opponent's forces are. Players sit back to back, and as their units "search" the map, each player calls out a hex number, and the opponent replies if there is a unit hidden in that hex, similar to the children's game Battleship. Several scenarios are provided with specific victory conditions. For example, in one scenario, the Russian player has to successfully escape from a village before numerically superior Allied forces can find and destroy the Russians. Each turn represents 20 seconds in game time.

Publication history
In 1973, SPI released Sniper!, the first commercial tactical board wargaming treatment of man-to-man combat in the Second World War. the first Cityfight was designed by Joseph M. Balkoski and Stephen A. Donaldson, and published by SPI in 1979. Reviewer Paul King noted several problems with Sniper!, namely the fact that all the counters were visible on the board for both players, meaning "players would react to this situation so that the combatants went about the board with precognition." In 1979, SPI released Cityfight, a game that tried to correct this by giving each player an identical mapboard, where enemy counters would appear only when spotted. The game was designed by Joseph M. Balkoski and Stephen A. Donaldson, with graphics and artwork by Redmond A. Simonsen.

Reception
In Issue 27 of Phoenix, Paul King thought the large amount of the material in the box "is enough to make all but the strongest heart quail." Nevertheless, King found the game very playable, much improved over the game mechanics of Sniper!, and enjoyable to play. He concluded, "Cityfight has the makings of a great game."

The Big Board reviewed Cityfight, and found the rules clearly presented. "Reading through them, it is easy to visualize the game sequence and understand the various mechanics." The reviewer found the occasional bit of humor enjoyable as well, quoting the rule “Irregular units may not execute indirect fire; they may, however, execute the mayor.” Because of the double-blind set-up, the reviewer thought "SPI’s CityFight is a tense game. In this game, there was very little contact between the opposing sides, yet their presence was felt at all times. [...] Unlike most wargames that give players omniscience over the battlefield, CityFight leaves you almost completely in the dark. Turns can be deadly quiet, almost boring, and all of a sudden, a firefight breaks out."

Awards
At the 1980 Origins Awards, City Fight won the Charles S. Roberts Award for Best 20th Century Game of 1979.

Reviews
 Fire & Movement #25
 Moves #58
 Campaign #96
 Journal of Twentieth Century Wargaming #13
American Wargamer Vol. 8, #12
Wargame News #34

References

Cold War board wargames
Origins Award winners
Simulations Publications games
Wargames introduced in 1979